Teddy Grahams are bear-shaped graham cracker snacks created by Nabisco. Introduced in 1988, Teddy Grahams come in two distinct shapes: bears with arms up and legs closed, and bears with legs open and arms down. When first introduced, Teddy Grahams were available in honey, cinnamon, and chocolate flavors. Since then, they have added chocolatey chip as one of the 4 main varieties. They also had vanilla, banana, birthday cake, mixed berry, strawberry banana, and apple flavors but they have been discontinued.

Nabisco has also put out various other products under the Teddy Grahams brand, including various Disney character shaped grahams.

Nutritional information
Nabisco considers Teddy Grahams to be a healthy snack choice. In a 1992 New York Times article, Eating Well, Marian Burros pointed out that Teddy Grahams use more bleached flour than actual whole wheat graham flour. In response, Nabisco increased the amount of whole grain flour used in the snack. The snacks also contain no trans fat and are also considered a good source of calcium with a significant amount of iron.

History
Teddy Grahams sold more than $150 million worth in its first year. It was "the biggest new-product success in the industry in more than 25 years. It became the third-best-selling cookie, after Chips Ahoy! and the market leader, Oreo, both from Nabisco.

Discontinued Products
Dizzy Grizzlies were a variant of Teddy Grahams, and were so called because they would "become dizzy" due to the snacker looking at each side again and again, as the backside is covered with chocolate and sprinkles. These were also themed in extreme sports such as in-line skating.

A chocolate chip, birthday cake and oatmeal variety were introduced as a cereal called Teddy grahams Breakfast Bears in the 90s however this cereal got bad reviews because it got too soggy in milk.

Teddy Soft Bakes were baked treats with either a vanilla or chocolate filling. They were discontinued around 2019.

Mascot Change 
The original mascot was a light brown bear who had no clothes. Later, Nabisco changed the mascot and added a shirt depending on what flavor of the teddy grahams. In 2017, they changed the mascot again to a brown bear with a blue and white striped shirt. Around January 2023, the mascot was changed again to a mascot that resembles the snack cookies themselves.

Media references 
At times Teddy Grahams have enjoyed a place in the spotlight, being used as a prop on Late Night with Conan O'Brien, were referenced on The Simpsons, and were referred to in a Strong Bad email. The snack was also referenced in the song "Ridin' Rims" by Dem Franchize Boyz, and on Saturday Night Live by the character Stefon.

See also
Hello Panda
Koala's March
Tiny Teddy

References

External links
 

Products introduced in 1988
Nabisco brands
Mondelez International brands